Campbell Gordon Calder (born 1952), known as Cam Calder, is a New Zealand doctor and politician who represented the National Party as a member of the House of Representatives from 2009 to 2014.

Background
Originally a dentist by trade, Calder was retraining as a doctor when he lost the sight in one eye through an accident. Calder previously served as president of the French New Zealand Business Council and has served on the international governing body for pétanque. He takes credit for being one of the people who "imported" pétanque into New Zealand. He has two children.

Member of Parliament

Calder was number 58 on the National Party list in the 2008 election. The provisional results of the election would have made him an MP, but the number of seats allocated to the National Party dropped by one in the final count, preventing Calder from entering Parliament. Calder also contested the Manurewa electorate in the 2008 and 2011 elections, but lost to Labour MPs George Hawkins and to Louisa Wall respectively.

After the resignation of Richard Worth on 12 June 2009, Calder entered Parliament in his place on 17 June 2009.

In caucus, Calder served on the Law and Order and Local Government and Environment Select Committees. As a member of the Blue-Greens Caucus Committee, he believed that the opportunities for New Zealand in Clean-Green Technology are significant and was interested in strategies to promote the decentralised generation of power from renewable sources; Calder authored a discussion paper on the subject.

His background, as a medical practitioner, has convinced him of the importance of personal responsibility in the maintenance of a healthy population. He is an enthusiastic advocate of a campaign to raise awareness of prostate cancer among New Zealand males.

A long-term interest in education led him to canvass caucus support for an addition to Te Whariki, The Early Childhood Education Curriculum, of a requirement to introduce children, four years and older, to the alphabet and basic numeracy.

Calder announced in October 2013 that he was going to retire from Parliament at the 2014 general election. Calder was replaced as Manurewa candidate by Simeon Brown, a local board member from the Manurewa area.

Calder acted as an observer in the 2015 Sri Lankan presidential election.

Notes

References

External links
 Dr Cam Calder MP official site
 Profile at National party
 

1952 births
People educated at New Plymouth Boys' High School
Living people
New Zealand dentists
New Zealand National Party MPs
Alumni of Magdalene College, Cambridge
New Zealand list MPs
Unsuccessful candidates in the 2008 New Zealand general election
Members of the New Zealand House of Representatives
21st-century New Zealand politicians